Semendyukovo is a rural locality (a village) in Bavlenskoye Rural Settlement, Kolchuginsky District, Vladimir Oblast, Russia. The population was 11 as of 2010. There are 2 streets.

Geography 
Semendyukovo is located 21 km northeast of Kolchugino (the district's administrative centre) by road. Bavleny is the nearest rural locality.

References 

Rural localities in Kolchuginsky District